The 1918 Haskell Indians football team was an American football team that represented the Haskell Indian Institute (now known as Haskell Indian Nations University) as an independent during the 1918 college football season. Practice started during the first week of September. In its first season under head coach J. E. Saunders, Haskell compiled a 1–4 record.

As of the fall of 1918, the Haskell Institute had 832 students. The 1918 Spanish flu pandemic struck the Haskell campus. By early November, 326 cases were reported with a total of seven deaths.

Schedule

References

Haskell
Haskell Indian Nations Fighting Indians football seasons
College football winless seasons
Haskell Indians football